Richard Paton (1717 – 7 March 1791) was a British marine painter.

Paton spent his artistic career in London, where he is said to have been  born, although no record of his birthplace or parentage is known. He is said to have grown up in poverty, and he is described as "self-taught". Some critics have discerned an influence of Samuel Scott's works, and also of Charles Brooking. Any such influence is hardly evident.

According to an account by Harry Parker, in "The Mariner's Mirror", March 1912, p 85, while Paton was begging  "on Tower Hill, he attracted the attention of Admiral Sir Charles Knowles (died 1777), who happened to be passing that way, and who, taking a fancy to the boy, offered to take him to sea".  He was assistant to the ship’s painter on Knowles' ship, gaining knowledge in both painting and seamanship. In 1742, he started working at the Excise Office.

His first exhibition was in 1758 on the premises of the London-based Society of Artists, where he continued to exhibit up to 1770. The Royal Academy hosted his works between 1762 and 1780.

Paton's specialities were marine and naval paintings. He painted naval actions of wars ongoing at the time of painting such as the Seven Years' War of 1756–1763 and later The American Revolutionary War, as well as earlier events such as the battles of the War of the Quadruple Alliance which took place when he was a baby. 
The paintings include many dramatic effects such as battles at night, the shooting of cannons and the effect of bombardments. Paton also painting civilian themes, such as merchant ships becalmed. His "sublime depiction of the sky" was considered especially noteworthy. Prints of his works, made among others by French artist Pierre-Charles Canot, made them widely known.

Among his most well-known works is the Action Between the Serapis and Bonhomme Richard, depicting the confrontation of the British captain Richard Pearson and the American captain John Paul Jones, occurring on 23 September 1779, off Flamborough Head. It ended with an American victory; nevertheless, the painting achieved success when included among the prints published within a year of the battle, while the war was still going on, by James Fittler and Daniel Lerpinière. The painting is at present in the museum of the United States Naval Academy at Annapolis.

References

External links
 

18th-century English painters
English male painters
Royal Navy
1717 births
1791 deaths
18th-century English male artists